Marcelo Messias (born November 9, 1981 in Paranaguá) is a Brazilian-Salvadoran professional football defender.

Club career

FAS
Messias signed with FAS of the Salvadoran Primera División in 2003. With the Santa Ana team, he won the Apertura 2003 and the Apertura 2004.

Also, he lost the Clausura 2004 final against Alianza on penalties.

Isidro Metapán
Messias signed with Isidro Metapán in 2006.

Chalatenango
Messias signed with Chalatenango in 2007.

Return to Isidro Metapán
He signed again with Isidro Metapán in 2008.

Águila
Time later. he signed with Águila.

Alianza
In 2010, he signed with Alianza. With Alianza, he lost the Apertura 2010 final against Isidro Metapán on penalties. However, in the next tournament, Alianza won the Clausura 2011 final against FAS.

Deportivo Petapa
In 2012, he signed with Deportivo Petapa.

Return to Alianza
Messias signed again with Alianza for the Clausura 2013.

Return to Chalatenango
In 2015, he signed again with Chalatenango.

Sonsonate
Messias signed with Sonsonate for the Apertura 2016.

Audaz
Messias signed with Audaz for the Clausura 2018. With Audaz, reached the quarter-finals of the Apertura 2018.

International career
Messias was called up to train with the national team preliminary squad, which would take part in two friendly matches in March 2011.

Messias was able to be noticed and would take part in the first friendly of that month against Cuba and Jamaica. Messias came on as a substitute in that friendly match against Cuba and started against Jamaica.

Personal
Messias is married to a Salvadoran woman and he has two daughters.
He is now a Salvadoran citizen.

References

External links
 

1981 births
Living people
People from Paranaguá
Brazilian footballers
Brazilian expatriate footballers
Naturalized citizens of El Salvador
Brazilian emigrants to El Salvador
Salvadoran footballers
El Salvador international footballers
C.D. FAS footballers
A.D. Isidro Metapán footballers
C.D. Chalatenango footballers
C.D. Águila footballers
Alianza F.C. footballers
Expatriate footballers in Guatemala
Expatriate footballers in El Salvador
Antigua GFC players
C.D. Sonsonate footballers
Association football defenders
Deportivo Petapa players
Sportspeople from Paraná (state)